Homaloptera orthogoniata is a species of ray-finned fish in the genus Homaloptera found in Thailand, Laos and Indonesia.

References

Homaloptera
Fish described in 1902